John David "J. D." Folsom (born August 19, 1984) is a former American football linebacker. He was drafted by the Miami Dolphins in the seventh round of the 2009 NFL Draft. He played college football at Weber State. Folsom was also a member of the Chicago Bears Tampa Bay Buccaneers and Arizona Cardinals. He is currently attending Oklahoma State University to be a veterinarian.

Early years
Folsom attended Salmon High School in Salmon, Idaho, where he played quarterback and linebacker and earned Second-team All-State honors as a senior. He was also a national qualified in team roping for the school's high school rodeo team.

College career

Snow College
Folsom attended Snow College in Ephraim, Utah in 2003 before leaving to serve a two-year LDS church mission in Santa Cruz, Bolivia.

Upon his return in 2006, he helped Snow to an 11-1 record and a No. 2 ranking in the NJCAA. He recorded 69.5 tackles, 10 tackles for a loss and three sacks on his way to First-team All-WSFL and Second-team NJCAA All-American honors. He was also a First-team NJCAA Academic All-American.

Weber State
Folsom transferred from Snow to Weber State and became the team's starting strong side linebacker. He appeared in 11 games and recorded 73 tackles (30 solo), 5.5 tackles for a loss, two sacks and a fumble recovery. Following the season, Folsom earned First-team All-Big Sky honors.

Folsom started six of the 12 games in which he played for the Wildcats as a senior in 2008, recording 76 tackles (27 solo), four tackles for a loss, one interception, one forced fumble and one fumble recovery. He, again, earned First-team All-Big Sky honors.

Professional career

Pre-draft
At his Weber State pro day he measured 6-3, 230 pounds and ran a 4.59 forty-yard dash, had a vertical jump of 32" and broad jump of 9'8", a 3-Cone drill of 7.30 and did 20 reps of 225 pounds on the bench press.

Miami Dolphins
Folsom was drafted by the Miami Dolphins in the seventh round (214th overall) of the 2009 NFL Draft. According to Folsom, he was surprised to be drafted and had already been preparing for a career after football, having been accepted to veterinary school at Oklahoma State and Washington State.

Folsom was waived by the Dolphins during final cuts on September 5 and re-signed to the team's practice squad the following day. He later was added to the 53-man roster on November 8, and saw his first game action the same day. He was waived again on November 13 and re-signed to the practice squad on November 18. Folsom was promoted to the active roster again on January 2, 2010 after linebacker Channing Crowder was placed on injured reserve.

Folsom was re-signed to the Miami Dolphins practice squad on December 1, 2010 but released on December 8, 2010.

Chicago Bears
Folsom was a member of the Chicago Bears practice squad from September 6, 2010 to September 23, 2010 when he was released.

Tampa Bay Buccaneers
Folsom was signed to the Tampa Bay Buccaneers practice squad on September 29, 2010. Folsom was later released October 11, 2010. Folsom was re-signed on December 14, 2010. The Buccaneers released Folsom on July 29, 2011.

Arizona Cardinals
Folsom was signed to the Arizona Cardinals practice squad on October 27, 2010, and later released on November 9, 2010.

References

External links
Miami Dolphins bio
Weber State Wildcats bio

1984 births
Living people
People from Salmon, Idaho
Players of American football from Idaho
American Mormon missionaries in Bolivia
21st-century Mormon missionaries
American football linebackers
Snow Badgers football players
Weber State Wildcats football players
Weber State University alumni
Miami Dolphins players
Chicago Bears players
Tampa Bay Buccaneers players
Arizona Cardinals players
Latter Day Saints from Idaho